René Jolivet (1898–1975) was a French screenwriter and film director. He co-directed the 1956 adventure film The Adventures of Gil Blas.

Selected filmography
 Women's Prison (1938)
 Angelica (1939)
 La tradition de minuit (1939)
 On demande un ménage (1946)
 The Fugitive (1947)
 Night Express (1948)
 Le sorcier du ciel (1949)
 Thus Finishes the Night (1949)
 La peau d'un homme (1951)
 L'étrange amazone (1953)
 Eighteen Hour Stopover (1955)
 The Adventures of Gil Blas (1956)
 A Certain Monsieur Jo (1958)
 Les mordus (1960)

References

Bibliography
 Crisp, Colin. French Cinema—A Critical Filmography: Volume 1, 1929–1939. Indiana University Press, 2015.
 Klossner, Michael. The Europe of 1500-1815 on Film and Television: A Worldwide Filmography of Over 2550 Works, 1895 Through 2000. McFarland & Company, 2002.

External links

1898 births
1975 deaths
French screenwriters
French film directors
People from Albertville
20th-century French screenwriters